Lai Zhongjian (born January 28, 1988 in Guigang, Guangxi) is a Chinese swimmer, who competed for Team China at the 2008 Summer Olympics.

Major achievements
2004 National Championships - 1st 200 m breast;
2004 Olympic Games - 14th 200 m breast

References
http://2008teamchina.olympic.cn/index.php/personview/personsen/797

1988 births
Living people
Olympic swimmers of China
People from Guigang
Swimmers at the 2008 Summer Olympics
Swimmers from Guangxi
Swimmers at the 2006 Asian Games
Asian Games medalists in swimming
Asian Games silver medalists for China
Medalists at the 2006 Asian Games
Chinese male breaststroke swimmers
20th-century Chinese people
21st-century Chinese people